Melodie Monrose is a French fashion model from Martinique.

Career

Monrose began her modeling career in 2010 at the age of 18, when she was discovered by Your Angels Models, a local modeling agency in her native Martinique.  Just weeks after signing with Your Angels Models Monrose began working with Wilhelmina in New York and Silent models in Paris.  Debuting during the S/S 2011 collections in New York, Monrose has since walked the runway for top designers including Michael Kors, Bottega Veneta, Lanvin, Miu Miu, and Yves Saint Laurent.  After her first runway season Monrose was named a top 10 new face by Style.com, Models.com, and COACD.  In July 2011 Monrose left Wilhelmina for Silent models, which now represents her in both New York and Paris.

Monrose has appeared in Vogue Italia, Harper's Bazaar, Vogue Turkey, Interview, Dazed, and V.  She was photographed by Mario Testino for the F/W 2011 D&G ad campaign.

Personal life
Before becoming a model Monrose dreamed of a career as a designer.  Deeply interested in fashion, in a January 2011 interview with Vogue Italia she named John Galliano, Zac Posen, Tom Ford, and Marc Jacobs as her favorite designers.

References

External links
http://models.com/models/Melodie-Monrose

Living people
1992 births
Martiniquais female models
Next Management models
French people of Martiniquais descent
Martiniquais expatriates in the United States